Glochidion papenooense, also known by its synonym Phyllanthus papenooense, is a species of tree in the family Phyllanthaceae. It is endemic to the island of Tahiti in the Society Islands of French Polynesia, where it is restricted to wetland habitats. Because of its rarity, it is protected by law in French Polynesia.

References

Flora of French Polynesia
papenooense
Critically endangered plants
Taxonomy articles created by Polbot